East Longmeadow is a town in Hampden County, Massachusetts, United States situated in the Pioneer Valley region of Western Massachusetts. It had a population of 16,430 at the 2020 census.

The development of East Longmeadow around the turn-of-the century was largely reliant on the brownstone quarrying industry. The industry brought many Swedish immigrants, formerly of Connecticut, along with large French and Italian populations to the area. These immigrants would typically labor in the quarries.

East Longmeadow hosts an annual Fourth of July Parade, which is one of the largest Fourth of July parades in Western Massachusetts. East Longmeadow High School also serves as host to an annual Fourth of July fireworks display, traditionally held on July 3.

History
The town of Longmeadow, Massachusetts was first settled in the 17th century. In the 1750s houses started appearing in the eastern part of the town known as "East Village". In 1894, East Village separated from Longmeadow, and became officially incorporated as East Longmeadow in the same year. The town became well  known for its brownstone quarries, even when it was still a part of Longmeadow.

A railroad was built through the town in the late 19th century by Springfield and New London Railroad. The railroad wasn't a part of a major route so it became abandoned by the 1980s. In the early 2010s, a bike path called The Redstone Rail Trail was built on a 1.6 mile section of where the tracks ran. It starts from Maple Street by Dunkin' Donuts to  Denslow Road, out by the Hasbro plant (now Cartamundi). In 2020, the old train depot was bought and renovated into an ice cream stand. It opened for the first time in spring 2021.

Sports 
East Longmeadow and Longmeadow compete in an annual Thanksgiving Day football game that routinely attracts a few thousand spectators. The town is also the home to the 2007 and  2019 Western Massachusetts champions in Varsity High School Baseball, along with the Western Mass champions in Girls Indoor Track in 2010, and 2011.

Geography

East Longmeadow is bordered by Enfield and Somers, Connecticut, to the south; Hampden to the east; Wilbraham on the northeast; Springfield on the north and northwest; and Longmeadow on the west.

Demographics

As of the census of 2010, there were 16,187 people, 5,248 households, and 3,988 families residing in the town. The racial makeup of the town was 97.52% White, 0.74% African American, 0.04% Native American, 0.88% Asian, 0.05% Pacific Islander, 0.24% from other races, and 0.52% from two or more races. Hispanic or Latino of any race were 0.92% of the population.

There were 5,248 households, out of which 34.1% had children under the age of 18 living with them, 65.7% were married couples living together, 7.5% had a female householder with no husband present, and 24.0% were non-families. 21.6% of all households were made up of individuals, and 13.8% had someone living alone who was 65 years of age or older. The average household size was 2.65 and the average family size was 3.10.

In the town, the population was spread out, with 24.8% under the age of 18, 5.5% from 18 to 24, 26.4% from 25 to 44, 24.6% from 45 to 64, and 18.8% who were 65 years of age or older. The median age was 41 years. For every 100 females, there were 90.7 males. For every 100 females age 18 and over, there were 86.2 males.

The median income for a household in the town was $62,680, and the median income for a family was $70,571. Males had a median income of $51,062 versus $32,267 for females. The per capita income for the town was $27,659. About 2.1% of families and 3.4% of the population were below the poverty line, including 4.7% of those under age 18 and 5.9% of those age 65 or over.

Points of interest

A point of interest in East Longmeadow is Heritage Park. Heritage Park has a body of water (Blackman's Pond) with fish, as well as baseball fields, soccer field, playscape, and a picnicking area. Historic places in East Longmeadow include the numerous red and brown sandstone quarries that gave the town its industrial beginnings and from which the original Smithsonian Institution building in Washington was mined, the Elijah Burt House, The Seward Pease House, The Train depot, and the First Congregational Church.  
Another point of interest is the area around the central rotary called "The rotary". Here, there are small shops, including many restaurants such as Koffee Tyme, DeNardo's, Fazio's, Romito & Sons (closed), the Pizza Shoppe, Center Square Grill, Bentley's (closed), and recently The Beer Shop and The Depot at Graham Station. The Rotary itself was made famous by Robert Ripley, author of Ripley's Believe It or Not and listed because of the seven streets feeding into it with no traffic lights. Also an integral part of East Longmeadow are the many churches, such as St. Michael's (Catholic), St. Paul's (Lutheran), St. Mark's (Episcopal), First Congregational (UCC), First Baptist, Cornerstone Church, East Longmeadow United Methodist, St. Luke's (Greek Orthodox) and many more.
Also, East Longmeadow was home to Milton Bradley Company for many years, and still houses one of their largest facilities after Hasbro bought this corporation in 1984. In 2016 the Hasbro location was purchased by Cartamundi. East Longmeadow is also home (or partial home) to a few golf courses such as Fenway Golf/Pine Knoll Executive Golf Course and Franconia Golf Course. The Clubhouse is located on Dwight St in Springfield, but the course itself runs into East Longmeadow on Westwood Avenue and into Longmeadow as well.

Government

Until June 30, 2016, East Longmeadow had an annual open town meeting held on the third Monday in May presided by a town moderator, who also was responsible for appointing the town's Appropriations Committee. The chief executive board in the town was the Board of Selectmen. It consisted of three popularly elected members who held staggered three-year terms.

Besides this board which also served the role of Fire and Police Commissioners, and the Board of Health, the town had a series of independent Executive Boards. The Boards of Public Works, Planning, Library Trustees, Assessors, a School Committee and an independent yet elected Housing Authority Board. The town also has numerous advisory boards under these various executive boards.

Charter Review Commission: The East Longmeadow Charter Review Commission was elected in April 2015 to review the form of town government and to write a town charter for submission to the voters. This passed in April 2016.

Town Council 

In June 2016, East Longmeadow elected a seven-member Town Council. 
Current Town Councilors are listed below. 
 *Appointed by Town Council to fill vacancy, won election in the next year's annual election
In December 2016, the Town Council voted unanimously (7–0) to offer Denise Menard the job of Town Manager. She was the first Town Manager in East Longmeadow history until her retirement in August 2019. Mary McNally was hired as the town's second-ever Town Manager in late 2019. In October 2021, McNally resigned as Town Manager. 

With the adoption of the new charter, East Longmeadow became a statutory city under Massachusetts state law on July 1, 2016.

School Committee 

Elected by the voters is a five-member school committee. They serve staggered three-year terms.

Education

Library

The East Longmeadow public library began in 1896, but in 2004 a new library was built. In fiscal year 2008, the town of East Longmeadow spent 1.4% ($584,361) of its budget on its public library; $38 per person.

Notable people

 Kim Adler, professional bowler, 15 national PWBA titles including the 1999 U.S. Women's Open
 Nick Ahmed, professional Baseball Player for the Arizona Diamondbacks
 Victoria Aveyard, writer, author of the popular YA Series, Red Queen
 Anne Burlak, early twentieth-century leader in labor organizing and leftist political movements
 Tim Daggett, Olympic gold medalist
 Peter Dolfen, sport shooter who competed in the 1912 Summer Olympics
 Jim Douglas, politician, graduated from East Longmeadow High School
 Pete Franklin, sports talk radio host, born in East Longmeadow
 Joseph Grigely, visual artist and scholar
 John Kawie, comedian, actor and writer
 Erik P. Kraft, writer, grew up in East Longmeadow, and his novel Miracle Wimp is set there
 Brian Lees, Massachusetts politician, former State Senator from the First Hampden and Hampshire District and Massachusetts Senate Minority Leader
 Sue C. Nichols, artist, best known for her work with Walt Disney Animation Studios
 James Lorin Richards, financier and industrialist, born on a farm in East Longmeadow
 Kyle Smith, writer, film critic for the New York Post, grew up in East Longmeadow
 Raymond F. Sullivan, politician who served on the Massachusetts Governor's Council
 Antonio Thomas, professional wrestler and personal trainer
 James Thorpe, soccer player
 Jim Trelease, educator and author
 Frank Vatrano, professional Ice Hockey player for the New York Rangers
 Robert F. Willard, retired United States Navy admiral, graduated from East Longmeadow High School

References 
 "East Longmeadow Massachusetts, 1894-1994 : Centennial edition", Heather Ewell Huntley.  (Editor).  [East Longmeadow, Mass. : s.n.] : State College, PA : Jostens Printing & Publishing Division, 1994.

External links

Official website

 
Cities in Hampden County, Massachusetts
Springfield metropolitan area, Massachusetts
Cities in Massachusetts